Council of Institutional Investors is a nonprofit, nonpartisan association of U.S. pension funds and other employee benefit funds, foundations and endowments that "promotes the interests of institutional investors in the United States". It describes its mission as to "educate its members, policymakers and the public about corporate governance, shareholder rights and related investment issues, and to advocate on members' behalf." 

The CII was founded in 1985 by 21 public pension fund officials and has grown to include over 140 institutional investors (public, union and corporate employee benefit plans and foundations and endowments) whose combined assets exceed $4 trillion. 

It maintains its headquarters in Washington, D.C., and as of mid-2012, its chair was Anne Sheehan (California State Teachers' Retirement System), and co-chairs were Lydia Beebe, Jay Chaudhuri, and Patrick O’Neill.

The primary function of the CII is to develop and advocate for best practices in the field of corporate governance. These policies may relate to matters such as shareholder rights, executive compensation, CEO succession, and board refreshment. The CII explicitly advocates for equal shareholder voting rights under the "one share, one vote" principle of shareholder democracy. As such, the CII is strongly against dual-class stock structures, which create significant imbalances in corporate control. The Council also engages with proxy advisory firms, which advise most institutional investors on shareholder voting matters.

The CII itself has a 15-person board of directors that comprises 6 officer and 9 non-officer members. As of November 2022, Scott Zdrazil serves as chair of the board, along with co-chairs Margaret Foran, Thomas McIntyre, and Aiesha Mastagni.

Notes

External links
 

Institutional investors